Route 24 is a  freeway south of Interstate 93 (I-93) in southeastern Massachusetts, linking Fall River with the Boston metropolitan area.  It begins in the south in Fall River at the border with Tiverton, Rhode Island where it connects with Rhode Island Route 24, and runs north to an interchange with I-93/U.S. Route 1 (US 1) in Randolph. Route 24 is also known as the Fall River Expressway, and officially as the Amvets Highway. Route 24 has a total of 21 interchanges (including the split at its northern terminus with I-93.)

Route 24 connects many of the major cities of Southeastern Massachusetts with Boston and Providence: Brockton, Taunton, Fall River, and New Bedford (via the junction with Route 140).

Route description
The highway continues at the Rhode Island border at Rhode Island Route 24 and meets Interstate 195 in Fall River.  It briefly runs concurrently with I-195 east (for less than a mile), then exits the interstate and travels north, merging with Route 79 at Exit 7 in northern Fall River.  Routes 24 and 79 run concurrently northward until Exit 9 (Assonet).  At this point, Route 79 exits the freeway and heads northeast.  Route 24 continues north, intersecting the northern end of the Taunton-New Bedford Expressway (Route 140) in Taunton, and Interstate 495 in Bridgewater. The highway continues north through the city of Brockton and into Randolph, where Route 24 ends at a split junction with Interstate 93.  This section of I-93 from Braintree to its junction with I-95 is frequently, yet erroneously, referred to by its former designation of Route 128.  This designation was removed from I-93 in 1989, when the roadway obtained the additional designation of U.S. Route 1, although this is not shown on exit signs from Route 24.  The route is officially 40.9 miles in length, however, mileposts continue up to 41.2 on the Exit 21B ramp to I-93 south.

Service plazas are located on either side of Route 24 in Bridgewater.

History
Route 24, along with Route 138, are both built parallel to an old Native American trail that went along the same north/south route from south of the Boston area into Boston. Route 124 on Cape Cod was originally designated Route 24 before 1951, and its number was changed to 124 upon the completion of the initial stretch of the Route 24 freeway.

The original portion of Route 24 opened in 1951, and brought commuters from Exit 10 in Assonet to Raynham.  Route 24 is currently 40 miles (65 km) in length and has 21 interchanges from Fall River to Randolph.

Efforts to upgrade to Interstate standards
There have been calls over the years for Route 24 to be upgraded to an interstate highway. In 1997, a study was initiated by the Massachusetts Highway Department (MHD) and the SRPEDD on what improvements were necessary in order to convert the route to an Interstate highway. The project would require major upgrades to 11 interchanges and minor work on 6 others, and the plan was halted due to high costs. In April 2007 the Old Colony Regional Planning Council included this proposal in its 25-year regional transportation plan draft. The Southeastern Regional Planning and Economic Development District (SRPEDD) endorsed a similar proposal the month before which if built, according to a MassHighway official, would have been signed as an extension of I-93. The portion south of I-195 would have remained MA-24 and then RI-24.  This proposal too was eventually tabled due to high costs, especially those projected for reconstruction of part of the highway south of Interstate 495. Here were the early cost estimates for the Interstate upgrade project: Phase I: Randolph I-93 Interchange Reconstruction ($30 million), Phase II: Randolph to Stoughton ($56 million), Phase III: Canton to Bridgewater ($224 million), Phase IV: Bridgewater to I-495 ($175 million), Phase V: I-495 to US 44 ($35 million), and Phase VI: US 44 to Fall River ($357 million). The total cost was expected to be $877 million. There are currently no proposals in the MassDOT highway listings to upgrade MA 24 to an interstate. The only projects that may relate to this happening in the future are reconstruction of three bridges starting in 2015, which include the one for US 44 in Raynham.

Exit list
All interchanges were to be renumbered to mileage-based numbers under a project scheduled to start in 2016. However, this project was indefinitely postponed by MassDOT until on November 18, 2019 the MassDot confirmed that beginning in late summer 2020 the exit renumbering project will begin. Renumbering the exits along this highway started on January 6, 2021, and it was completed on January 19.

References

Further reading
 
 
 

Freeways in the United States
024
Transportation in Bristol County, Massachusetts
Transportation in Norfolk County, Massachusetts
Transportation in Plymouth County, Massachusetts